The 2011 CFL season was the 58th season of modern-day Canadian football.  Officially, it was the 54th season of the Canadian Football League.  The complete schedule was released on February 18 and featured the defending Grey Cup champion Montreal Alouettes opening the season against the visiting BC Lions on Thursday, June 30, 2011.  The season was among the most notable in the modern era for the competitiveness of the teams; going into the final week, five teams were tied for first place in the league, a first in modern CFL history.  It was also the first time since 1982 that all teams finished with fewer than 12 wins in the regular season.  As well, for the first time since 1950, the start of the modern era, all four teams competing in the division finals were different from the four teams that had competed in the division finals the previous year.   Newly renovated BC Place Stadium in Vancouver hosted the 99th Grey Cup on November 27, with the hometown Lions defeating the Winnipeg Blue Bombers 34–23 in front of a sold-out crowd.

CFL news in 2011

Touchdown Atlantic
The CFL returned to Moncton for the second installment of the Touchdown Atlantic series. The Hamilton Tiger-Cats were the home team, while the Calgary Stampeders were the visitors with the game having taken place on Sunday, September 25.

Labour Day Classic twist
When the 2011 schedule was released, it was revealed that the typical Labour Day Classic match-up featuring the Hamilton Tiger-Cats hosting the Toronto Argonauts would not occur this year for the first time since 1995. Instead the Tiger-Cats will play host to the Montreal Alouettes and then visit the Alouettes the following week as a part of a home-and-home series. While the fan reaction was heated, Commissioner Mark Cohon explained that due to a lack of available home dates for the Argonauts, Toronto would be hosting a game against the BC Lions that weekend, necessitating the need for the change. This was the ninth time that Hamilton played Montreal on the Labour Day weekend.

Rule changes
On April 14, 2011, it was announced that four significant rule changes would be introduced for the 2011 season. The following changes were implemented:
Expanding the use of instant replay on game-changing plays and giving the CFL Command Centre more control over these calls. These include:
Awarding possession to the defensive team if they successfully challenged and recovered a loose ball that was fumbled by a quarterback that was originally ruled an incomplete pass.
Awarding possession to the defensive team if they successfully challenged and recovered a loose ball that was fumbled by a receiver after a catch that was originally ruled an incomplete pass.
Eliminating blocking below the waist after a completed pass. This means that the offensive team can only block above the waist of a defender, otherwise it will yield a 10-yard penalty. Blocking below the waist is still permissible on running plays and on plays where the pass is completed behind the line of scrimmage.
Adding 10 yards to an illegal punt that goes out of bounds. If a punt goes out of bounds in the air (i.e. without bouncing) between the 20-yard lines, the receiving team will have the option of taking the ball where it went out of bounds plus 10 yards or have the kicking team re-kick 10 yards further back from the original line of scrimmage.
Specifying that if a player is pushed out of bounds by an opponent, he can return to the field and make a play. Originally, the rule did not state that there had to be bodily contact from an opponent.

Hall of Fame induction weekend
For the third consecutive year, the Canadian Football Hall of Fame induction weekend events took place outside of Hamilton, Ontario, the home of the museum. It took place in Calgary from September 14 to 18, with the hall of fame game itself featuring the Calgary Stampeders hosting the BC Lions on Saturday, September 17, 2011.

Salary Cap
According to the new collective bargaining agreement, the 2011 salary cap will be set at $4,300,000. As per the agreement, the cap is fixed and will not vary with league revenue performance. The minimum team salary will be set at $3,900,000 with individual minimum salaries set at $43,000.

Records and milestones
 On July 15, Montreal Alouettes quarterback Anthony Calvillo completed his 395th career touchdown to Eric Deslauriers to move past Damon Allen to become the CFL leader for most touchdown passes.
 On August 4, Anthony Calvillo completed his 5,159th pass completion to Brandon London to move past Damon Allen to become the CFL leader for most pass completions.
 On October 8, BC Lions kicker Paul McCallum kicked his 29th straight field goal to pass the previous record of 28 straight field goals set by Dave Ridgway.
 On October 10, Anthony Calvillo completed a 50-yard touchdown pass to Jamel Richardson to become professional football's all-time leading passer.
 On October 21, Toronto Argonauts wide receiver and kick returner Chad Owens became the first player in professional football to record at least 3,000 combined yards in back to back seasons.
 On October 28, Toronto Argonauts cornerback Byron Parker scored the ninth interception return touchdown of his career, surpassing the previous CFL record of eight shared by Dick Thornton, Malcolm Frank and Jason Goss.
 On November 5, Paul McCallum finished the season with a 94.3% field goal percentage, surpassing the previous record of 90.9% held by Lui Passaglia.

Regular season

Structure

Teams play eighteen regular season games, playing divisional opponents three or four times and teams from the opposing division twice. Teams are awarded two points for a win and one point for a tie. The top three teams in each division qualify for the playoffs, with the first place team gaining a bye to the divisional finals. A fourth place team may qualify ahead of the third place team in another conference (the "Crossover") if they earn more points in the season.

If two or more teams in the same division the following tiebreakers apply: 

a) Most wins in all matches
b) Head to head winning percentage (matches won divided by all matches played)
c) Head to head points difference
d) Head to head points ratio
e–g) Tiebreakers b–d applied sequentially to divisional games
h–i) Tiebreakers c–d applied sequentially to all games
j) Coin toss

Notes:

1. If two clubs remain tied after other club(s) are eliminated during any step, tie breakers reverts to step a).
2. Tiebreakers do not apply to the Crossover. To cross over a team must have more points than the third place team.

Standings

Note: GP = Games Played, W = Wins, L = Losses, T = Ties, PF = Points For, PA = Points Against, Pts = Points

Teams in bold are in playoff positions.

Award winners

CFL Player of the WeekSourceCFL Player of the MonthSource''

CFL playoffs

The BC Lions became the first team to win the Grey Cup on home turf since the 1994 BC Lions and became the first ever team to win the championship after starting the season 0-5 by defeating the Winnipeg Blue Bombers, 34–23 at Vancouver's BC Place Stadium.  Lions' quarterback Travis Lulay was named the MVP, while Lions' running back, Andrew Harris was named the Grey Cup's Most Valuable Canadian.

Playoff bracket

*-Team won in Overtime.

CFL Leaders
 CFL Passing Leaders
 CFL Rushing Leaders
 CFL Receiving Leaders

2011 CFL All-Stars

Offence
QB – Travis Lulay, BC Lions
RB – Jerome Messam, Edmonton Eskimos
RB – Brandon Whitaker, Montreal Alouettes
R – Nik Lewis, Calgary Stampeders
R – Jamel Richardson, Montreal Alouettes
R – Geroy Simon, BC Lions
R – Fred Stamps, Edmonton Eskimos
OT – Josh Bourke, Montreal Alouettes
OT – Jovan Olafioye, BC Lions
OG – Brendon LaBatte, Winnipeg Blue Bombers
OG – Dimitri Tsoumpas, Calgary Stampeders
OC – Angus Reid, BC Lions

Defence
DT – Aaron Hunt, BC Lions
DT – Khalif Mitchell, BC Lions
DE – Justin Hickman, Hamilton Tiger-Cats
DE – Odell Willis, Winnipeg Blue Bombers
LB – Chip Cox, Montreal Alouettes
LB – Solomon Elimimian, BC Lions
LB – Jerrell Freeman, Saskatchewan Roughriders
CB – Jovon Johnson, Winnipeg Blue Bombers
CB – Byron Parker, Toronto Argonauts
DB – Korey Banks, BC Lions
DB – Jonathan Hefney, Winnipeg Blue Bombers
S – Ian Logan, Winnipeg Blue Bombers

Special teams
K – Paul McCallum, BC Lions
P – Burke Dales, Calgary Stampeders
ST – Chad Owens, Toronto Argonauts

2011 CFL Western All-Stars

Offense
QB – Travis Lulay, BC Lions
RB – Jon Cornish, Calgary Stampeders
RB – Jerome Messam, Edmonton Eskimos
R – Weston Dressler, Saskatchewan Roughriders
R – Nik Lewis, Calgary Stampeders
R – Geroy Simon, BC Lions
R – Fred Stamps, Edmonton Eskimos
OT – Ben Archibald, BC Lions
OT – Jovan Olafioye, BC Lions
OG – Dimitri Tsoumpas, Calgary Stampeders
OG – Greg Wojt, Edmonton Eskimos
OC – Angus Reid, BC Lions

Defence
DT – Aaron Hunt, BC Lions
DT – Khalif Mitchell, BC Lions
DE – Marcus Howard, Edmonton Eskimos
DE – Keron Williams, BC Lions
LB – Rod Davis, Edmonton Eskimos
LB – Solomon Elimimian, BC Lions
LB – Jerrell Freeman, Saskatchewan Roughriders
CB – Dante Marsh, BC Lions
CB – Rod Williams, Edmonton Eskimos
DB – Korey Banks, BC Lions
DB – Keon Raymond, Calgary Stampeders
S –  Craig Butler, Saskatchewan Roughriders

Special teams
K – Paul McCallum, BC Lions
P – Burke Dales, Calgary Stampeders
ST – Larry Taylor, Calgary Stampeders

2011 CFL Eastern All-Stars

Offence
QB – Anthony Calvillo, Montreal Alouettes
RB – Cory Boyd, Toronto Argonauts
RB – Brandon Whitaker, Montreal Alouettes
R – Terrence Edwards, Winnipeg Blue Bombers
R – S. J. Green, Montreal Alouettes
R – Jamel Richardson, Montreal Alouettes
R – Chris Williams, Hamilton Tiger-Cats
OT – Josh Bourke, Montreal Alouettes
OT – Glenn January, Winnipeg Blue Bombers
OG – Scott Flory, Montreal Alouettes
OG – Brendon LaBatte, Winnipeg Blue Bombers
OC – Dominic Picard, Toronto Argonauts

Defence
DT – Doug Brown, Winnipeg Blue Bombers
DT – Kevin Huntley, Toronto Argonauts
DE – Justin Hickman, Hamilton Tiger-Cats
DE – Odell Willis, Winnipeg Blue Bombers
LB – Chip Cox, Montreal Alouettes
LB – Jamall Johnson, Hamilton Tiger-Cats
LB – Renauld Williams, Hamilton Tiger-Cats
CB – Byron Parker, Toronto Argonauts
CB – Jovon Johnson, Winnipeg Blue Bombers
DB – Jonathan Hefney, Winnipeg Blue Bombers
DB – Lin-J Shell, Toronto Argonauts
S – Ian Logan, Winnipeg Blue Bombers

Special teams
K – Justin Medlock, Hamilton Tiger-Cats
P – Noel Prefontaine, Toronto Argonauts
ST – Chad Owens, Toronto Argonauts

2011 Gibson's Finest CFL Awards
CFL's Most Outstanding Player Award – Travis Lulay (QB), BC Lions
CFL's Most Outstanding Canadian Award – Jerome Messam (RB), Edmonton Eskimos
CFL's Most Outstanding Defensive Player Award – Jovon Johnson (CB), Winnipeg Blue Bombers
CFL's Most Outstanding Offensive Lineman Award – Josh Bourke (OT), Montreal Alouettes
CFL's Most Outstanding Rookie Award – Chris Williams (WR), Hamilton Tiger-Cats
John Agro Special Teams Award – Paul McCallum (K), BC Lions
Tom Pate Memorial Award – Kevin Glenn (QB), Hamilton Tiger-Cats
Jake Gaudaur Veterans' Trophy – Andre Durie (RB/SB), Toronto Argonauts
Annis Stukus Trophy – Wally Buono, BC Lions
Commissioner's Award – Larry Reda
Hugh Campbell Distinguished Leadership Award - no recipient

References

Canadian Football League seasons
Cfl Season, 2011